Sharon Haydée Gómez Díaz (born January 4, 1986) is a Puerto Rican beauty pageant titleholder. She previously held the title of Miss Puerto Rico International 2006 in which later on she placed as finalist at the Miss International 2006 pageant. In early 2008 she participated in the reality show Nuestra Belleza Latina, however she failed to become one the final twelve contestants. Most recently she placed 3rd Runner-up at the Miss Hawaiian Tropic 2008 pageant and 2nd Runner-up at the Miss Puerto Rico Universe 2009 pageant where she represented Santurce.

References

Living people
1986 births
Puerto Rican beauty pageant winners
Miss International 2006 delegates